Pauline Burlet (born 9 April 1996) is a Belgian actress, who starred as 'Lili Franchet' in the French TV series Résistance.

Her first major role was in the 2007 film, La Vie en rose, as a young Edith Piaf. Burlet won a Magritte Award in 2014 for "most promising actress" for her performance in The Past (Le Passé).

Filmography

Film
 La Vie en rose (2007) as 10 years old Edith Piaf
 2 Sœurs (2007) (Short film) as Alice
 Alessandro (2009) (Short film) as Sabrina 
 Dead Man Talking (2012) as Sarah Raven
 The Past (2013) as Lucie
 The Connection (2014) as Lily Mariani
 Jailbirds (2015) as Jeanne
 Le Semeur (2017) as Violette

Television
 À tort ou à raison (2009–2011) (TV series) as Carole Scola
 Resistance (2014) (TV series) as Lili Franchet
 Road to Istanbul (2016) (TV movie) as Élodie

References

External links

Living people
21st-century Belgian actresses
Belgian actresses
Belgian film actresses
Belgian television actresses
Magritte Award winners
1996 births
Belgian child actresses